Carlos Vázquez may refer to:

 Carlos Alberto Vázquez, Argentine cyclist
 Cavafe (Carlos Alberto Vázquez Fernández), Cuban footballer
 Carlos Vázquez Úbeda, Spanish[painter